Simon Greul defeated Gastão Elias 2–6, 7–6(7–5), 7–5 in the final to win the title.

Seeds

Draw

Finals

Top half

Bottom half

References
 Main Draw
 Qualifying Draw

Aberto de Tenis do Rio Grande do Sul - Singles
2012 Singles